The Winston-Salem IceHawks were a minor professional ice hockey team in the United Hockey League (UHL) based in Winston-Salem, North Carolina. The franchise was relocated from Utica, New York, in 1997 and played for two seasons in North Carolina before relocating to Glens Falls, New York, to become the Adirondack IceHawks.

References

Defunct United Hockey League teams
Sports in Winston-Salem, North Carolina
Ice hockey teams in North Carolina
Ice hockey clubs established in 1997
Sports clubs disestablished in 1999
1997 establishments in North Carolina
1999 disestablishments in North Carolina